Fu Youde (died 20 December 1394) was a Chinese general and a highly competent commander in the Ming navy.

Early life 
Fu Youde came from an humble background in Anhui and became an eminent field marshal. In 1361, after serving under a succession of overlords, Fu surrendered to Zhu Yuanzhang. After his brilliant campaign in Suchuan in 1371, Fu was awarded the rank of marquis, and when the Prince of Yan met him in 1380, he was serving as Xu Da's deputy, training troops, conducting patrols of the border, and supervising the construction of defenses along the Great Wall.

Rise to prominence 

In the autumn of 1381 General Fu Youde was ordered to command an army of 300,000 troops in Yunnan—then still a remaining outpost of Mongol power. Along with Ting P’u-lang, Fu Youde defeated Basalawarmi while fighting under the Hongwu Emperor. Led by General Fu Youde, the Ming army attacked Yunnan and tried to subdue the Mongols. The Ming army killed an estimated 60,000 people and castrated the young sons of prisoners, according to an ancient custom.

Early in 1384 the campaign in Yunnan and Guizhou was declared over and General Fu was awarded a dukedom with an annual stipend of three thousand piculs of rice.

General Fu Youde came to Beiping in 1385 to take over the military command left vacant by the death of Xu Da. When Fu Youde took over the theater command of the Beiping garrison, he had about seventeen guard units with more than 131,000 men, while the troop strength of the entire country had exceeded the one million mark.

In time, Fu Youde rose through the ranks of the military, eventually becoming one of the Hongwu Emperor’s most important generals. However, he was eventually eliminated by the emperor in 1394, either by execution or suicide at the emperor's command.

Youde's son is thought to have married a princess and his daughter became a consort to the emperor's third son, Prince Gong of Jin.

See also
Ming campaign against the Uriankhai

References

1394 deaths
Ming dynasty generals
Ming dynasty politicians
Politicians from Suzhou, Anhui
Suicides by sharp instrument in China
Year of birth unknown
14th-century Chinese people
Generals from Anhui
People executed by the Ming dynasty
Executed Ming dynasty people
Executed people from Anhui
Forced suicides of Chinese people
Red Turban rebels